Provincial Health Services Authority (PHSA) is a publicly funded health service provider in the province of British Columbia. PHSA is unique in Canada as the only health authority having a province-wide mandate for specialized health services, although within British Columbia the First Nations Health Authority is also non-regional and highly dispersed. The five other health authorities in the province have regional jurisdiction. Services are provided either directly through PHSA agencies or through funding or collaboration with regional health authorities.

PHSA operates and manages a number of well-recognized specialized programs/services:
BC Cancer
BC Centre for Disease Control
BC Children's Hospital & Sunny Hill Health Centre for Children
BC Emergency Health Services (with programs BC Ambulance Service and the BC Patient Transfer Network)
Health Emergency Management BC
BC Mental Health & Substance Use Services
BC Renal 
BC Transplant
BC Women's Hospital & Health Centre
Cardiac Services BC
BC Centre for Excellence in HIV/AIDS (with the partnership with Providence Health and UBC)

The PHSA concentrates on doing three things to meet its responsibilities in health care:
 Provide leadership and management of selected agencies and organizations providing province-wide health care services;
 Ensure health care is delivered by overseeing performance agreements, expectations and funding allocations for selected provincial health care programs and services; and,
 Province-wide coordination of programs, services and support systems required by all health authorities and/or the Ministry of Health.

Management and employees 
Because of its provision of province-wide specialized care, PHSA has repeatedly had the five highest-paid employees (each a physician) in the public health sector listed in annual reviews by the Vancouver Sun newspaper.

Benoit Morin took over as president and CEO in February 2020 after the retirement of his predecessor, Carl Roy, who served as the executive leader of PHSA from January 2014 – February 2020. The organization’s first president and CEO, Lynda Cranston, resigned after a controversial wage increase for 118 senior managers during a province-wide wage freeze for the public health sector.

PHSA has been consistently named a top employer in Canada, and in October 2013 was again recognized with a national top employer honour.

See also

Regional health authorities in British Columbia

 Vancouver Coastal Health
 Fraser Health
 Interior Health
 Island Health
 Northern Health

Other non-regional health authorities in British Columbia

 First Nations Health Authority

References

External links
 

2001 establishments in British Columbia
Medical and health organizations based in British Columbia
Organizations based in Vancouver